A886 may refer to:
Opteron
A886 road, Scotland